Carbamoyl aspartic acid (or ureidosuccinic acid) is a carbamate derivative, serving as an intermediate in pyrimidine biosynthesis.

References

Ureas
Dicarboxylic acids